Projeto Fashion was a Brazilian reality television show based on the American program Project Runway, wherein fashion designers compete by making specific garments for weekly challenges.  The show features Adriane Galisteu as the host, and Susana Barbosa and Reinaldo Lourenço as judges. Alexandre Herchcovitch acts as a mentor to the contestants, as Tim Gunn does in the American version.

The winner of Projeto Fashion receives R$100,000 to start his own line, a new car and an editorial feature in the Brazilian edition of Elle magazine.

The series premiered on Saturday, September 17, 2011, at 10:30 p.m. on Band. On December 17, Cynthia Hayashi won the competition over Helena Wen and Talita Lima, who took second and third place respectively.

On December 12, 2011, it was confirmed that the series had been canceled and would not be returning for a second season.

Series overview

Seasons

Designers

Designer progress

Key

References

External links

2011 Brazilian television series debuts
2011 Brazilian television series endings
Brazilian reality television series
Brazil
Rede Bandeirantes original programming